Robert Lenard Lippert (March 31, 1909 – November 16, 1976) was an American film producer and cinema chain owner. He was president and chief operating officer of Lippert Theatres, Affiliated Theatres and Transcontinental Theatres, all based in San Francisco, and at his height, he owned a chain of 139 movie theaters.

He helped finance more than 300 films, including the directorial debuts of Sam Fuller, James Clavell, and Burt Kennedy. His films include I Shot Jesse James (1949) and The Fly (1958) and was known as "King of the Bs".

In 1962, Lippert said, "the word around Hollywood is: Lippert makes a lot of cheap pictures but he's never made a stinker".

Biography
Born in San Francisco, California and adopted by the owner of a hardware store, Robert Lippert became fascinated by the cinema at an early age. As a youngster, he worked a variety of jobs in local theaters, including projectionist and assistant manager. As a manager of a cinema during the Depression, Lippert encouraged regular attendance with promotions such as "Dish Night" and "Book Night."

Lippert went from cinema manager to owning a chain of cinemas in Alameda, California in 1942, during the peak years of theater attendance. Lippert's theaters in Los Angeles adopted a "grind house" policy, screening older and cheaper films for a continuous 24 hours with an admission price of 25 cents. Not only did his theaters attract shift workers and late-night revelers, but also servicemen on leave who could not find cheap accommodations and would sleep in the chairs.

In May 1948, he merged his theater chain with George Mann's, the founder of the Redwood Theatres. He also owned a number of drive-ins. The 139 theaters he eventually owned were mostly in Northern California and southern Oregon, as well as some in Southern California and Arizona.

Screen Guild Productions
"Every theater owner thinks he can make pictures better than the ones they sent him," Lippert later said. "So back in 1943, I tried it". Dissatisfied with what he believed to be exorbitant rental fees charged by major studios, Lippert formed Screen Guild Productions in 1945, its first release being a Bob Steele western called Wildfire, filmed in then-unusual Cinecolor. Veteran producer Edward Finney partnered with Lippert in 1946.

For the next few years Screen Guild entered into agreements with independent producers Finney, William Berke, William David, Jack Schwarz, Walter Colmes, and Ron Ormond to guarantee a steady supply of releases. One of the most controversial Screen Guild releases was The Burning Cross (1947), which concerned the Ku Klux Klan.

Lippert Pictures

Screen Guild became Lippert Pictures in 1948, using rental stages and the Corriganville Movie Ranch for the production of its films. 130 Lippert features were made and released between 1948 and 1955.

Lippert's fortunes and reputation improved when he sponsored screenwriter and former newspaper reporter Samuel Fuller. Fuller wanted to become a director, so he agreed to direct the three films he had been contracted to write for Lippert: I Shot Jesse James, The Baron of Arizona and The Steel Helmet, all for no extra money, accepting just the directing credit. The Fuller films received excellent reviews.

A 1949 New York Times profile said Lippert owned 61 theaters. It also reported (erroneously) that he had directed most of the Westerns his company had made.

Lippert tried to add luster to his productions, but only if it could be done economically. His studio became a haven for actors whose careers were interrupted when their studios, no longer making lower-budget pictures, released them from their contracts. Robert Lippert was able to sign major-studio talent for a fraction of the usual rate, giving his productions more marquee value. Among the established names who worked for Lippert were George Raft, Veronica Lake, Zachary Scott, Robert Hutton, Joan Leslie, Cesar Romero, George Reeves, Ralph Byrd, Richard Arlen, Don "Red" Barry, Robert Alda, Gloria Jean, Sabu, Ellen Drew, Preston Foster, Jean Porter, Anne Gwynne, Jack Holt, Hugh Beaumont, Tom Neal, Robert Lowery, and John Howard.

Lippert maintained a small stock company of supporting actors, including Margia Dean, Mara Lynn, Don Castle, and Reed Hadley. Lippert's most ubiquitous actor was probably the diminutive Sid Melton. He appeared as a supporting comedian in many of Lippert's productions and starred in three hour-long comedies.

The "name" cast ensembles were only part of Lippert's successful formula. Other selling angles were realized when certain of Lippert's features could be marketed in a process more elaborate than ordinary black-and-white. Lippert used Cinecolor and sepiatone to dress up his more ambitious features, and embellished others by using tinted film stock for special effects (mint green for Lost Continent, pinkish red-sepia for the Mars sequences in Rocketship X-M). He even anticipated the 3-D film craze by publicizing a special photographic lens, which he claimed gave a stereoscopic effect without special projection equipment.

In addition to his original productions, Lippert reissued older films to theaters under his own brand name, including several Hopalong Cassidy westerns and the Laurel and Hardy feature Babes in Toyland (reissued as March of the Wooden Soldiers).

Lippert read a 1949 Life magazine article about a proposed trip to and landing on the Moon. He rushed into production his version called Rocketship X-M, released a year later in 1950; he changed the film's destination to Mars to avoid copying exactly the same idea being utilized by producer George Pal in his large-budget, high-profile Destination Moon. Rocketship X-M succeeded in becoming the first post-war science fiction outer space drama to appear in theaters, but only by 20 days, while capitalizing on all the publicity surrounding the Pal film. More importantly, it became the first feature film drama to warn of the dangers and folly of full-scale atomic war.

Dealings and disputes with trade unions
In 1951, Lippert was anxious to sell his films to television. The American Federation of Musicians became involved, and Lippert had to rescore some of the films and pay an amount to the musicians' music fund.

Also in 1951, he clashed with the Screen Actors Guild when he sold his films to television. He was blackballed by the Guild, as a result. He was going to make films for television with Hal Roach, Jr., but problems with the Screen Actors Guild led to their cancellation. He ended up making only two, Tales of Robin Hood and Present Arms (released as As You Were). |In October 1951, Lippert signed a three-picture deal with the recently blacklisted Carl Foreman. He also signed a two-picture deal with blacklisted Paul Henreid but no films appear to have resulted. In 1951, he entered into an arrangement with Famous Artist Corporation to make features with their talent. By January 1952, however, the SAG dispute had not been resolved and Lippert announced he was leaving film production.

Hammer Films
In 1951, Lippert signed a four-year production and distribution contract with the British company Hammer Films by which Lippert would distribute Hammer movies in America, and Hammer would distribute Lippert's films in the UK. To ensure familiarity with American audiences, Lippert insisted on an American star supplied by him in the Hammer films he was to distribute. The first film produced under the contract was The Last Page, which starred George Brent

20th Century-Fox

Regal Pictures
When Darryl F. Zanuck announced his CinemaScope process, he faced hostility from many theater owners who had gone to great expense to convert their theaters to show 3-D films that Hollywood had stopped making. Zanuck assured them that they could have a large supply of CinemaScope product because Fox would make CinemaScope lenses available to other film companies and start a production unit, led by Lippert, called Regal Pictures in 1956 to produce B pictures in that process.

Lippert's company was contracted to make 20 pictures a year for seven years, each to be shot in seven days for no more than $100,000. Due to Lippert's problems with the film unions over not paying residuals to actors and writers of his films when they were sold to television, Ed Baumgarten was officially appointed the head of Regal, but Lippert had overall control. Regal Pictures filmed its movies with CinemaScope lenses, but due to 20th Century-Fox insisting that only its "A" films would be labelled CinemaScope, Regal's product used the term "Regalscope" in its films' credits.

Beginning with Stagecoach to Fury (1956), Regal produced 25 pictures in its first year.

Maury Dexter, who worked at Regal, later recalled the outfit's productions were all shot at independent sound stages because they could not afford to shoot at 20th Century Fox, due to the high cost of rental and overhead they charged. The films were entirely financed and released by Fox, but Regal was independent. Dexter says "the only stipulation production-wise was that we had to give Bausch and Lomb screen credit on each film for CinemaScope camera lenses, as well as being charged back to Fox, $3,000 of each budget.

Impressed by the unit's profits, Fox extended Regal's contract by a further 16 films with an "exploitation angle" that would be approved by Fox.

In November 1957, Regal announced that they would make ten films in three months.

Regal made a deal with actors and directors to play them a percentage of any money from the sale of films to television. It did not make a deal with writers, and the Screenwriters Guild forbade its writers to work for Lippert. Regal stopped making films.

In 1960, Lippert sold 30 Regal films to television for $1 million.

In October 1958, a new company was formed by Lippert, Regal Films, to make one a month low budget films for Fox, starting with Alaskan Highway. The company was headed by George Warren, a cost controller for MGM, with William Magginetti as production supervisor and Harry Spaulding as story editor. Lippert was described as being "associated" with the company.

"We use hack writers or new writers and beat-up faces or new faces", he said later. "No, I don't direct any of them. I wouldn't be a director for anything. No wonder they all have ulcers."

Associated Producers Incorporated
In 1959, Lippert renamed Regal as Associated Producers Incorporated (API) to make more low-budget films for double features (API having similar initials to exploitation specialist American International Pictures may have been coincidental).

The core of API was Harry Spalding and Maury Dexter. All API's productions were done in-house.

In October 1959, Lippert said making "little Bs" for $100,000 was no longer as lucrative because "it is now in the same category as the short TV feature which people can see for free." He persuaded Fox to start financing his films up to $300,000 and a shooting schedule of around 15 days starting with The Sad Horse.

"I have an angle on everything", he said in 1960, adding that he found it profitable to focus on small towns and country areas. "There's a lot of money in sticks."

In 1962, Lippert criticized Hollywood for the "slow suicide" in movie going, blaming involvement of New York bankers in creative matters, inflated overhead, union featherbedding and obsolete theaters.

"The economics of this business have gone cock-eyed", he added. "The total gross of pictures has dropped from 20-30% and the costs have doubled. It's nuts." By this stage, he estimated that he had made "about 300 films" including 100 for Fox in five years. "One year, I made 26, more than the rest of the studios."

"Most Bs cost $100,000 or $200,000", he said. "We shoot them in six or seven days. There's hardly any re-shooting. Unless something is glaringly wrong, we let 'em go. What the hell, people don't care. They want to be entertained. I've heard people coming out of my theaters after seeing a double bill that featured a big production, 'Everybody died' or 'How that girl suffered. Thank God for the little picture'."

Lippert said that he wanted to make more Westerns "because they're cheap" but did not because "television had saturated the market."

Faced with increasing production costs in Hollywood, Lippert announced in 1962 that he would be making films in England, Italy (The Last Man on Earth), and the Philippines. Fox ended Regal/API when its own production schedule had declined and it didn't have enough "A" features to support its "B" pictures.

Later career
In March 1966, Fox announced that Lippert would return to film production with Country Music.

Lippert's association with Fox ended after 250 films with The Last Shot You Hear that began filming in 1967 but was not released until 1969.

After stopping producing, Lippert doubled his chain of theaters from 70 to 139 and managed them until his death.

Personal life
In 1926, he married Ruth Robinson and they remained married until his death. He has a son, Robert L. Lippert Jr., and a daughter, Judith Ann. His son followed his father into producing and also helping manage the theater chain. Maury Dexter says Lippert had a mistress, Margia Dean, who he would insist appear in Lippert films.

Death
Lippert died of a heart attack, his second, at home in Alameda, California on November 16, 1976. His cremated remains were interred at the Woodlawn Memorial Park Cemetery in Colma, California.

Select filmography

Produced by Action Pictures, distributed by Screen Guild Productions
Wildfire: The Story of a Horse (1945) – starring Bob Steele, produced by William David, directed by Robert Emmett Tansey
Northwest Trail (1945) – starring Bob Steele, produced by William David, directed by Derwin Abrahams
God's Country (1946) – starring Bob Steele, produced by William David, directed by Robert Emmett Tansey

Produced by Affiliated Productions, distributed by Screen Guild Productions
Renegade Girl (1946) – starring Ann Savage, directed by William Berke
Rolling Home (1946) – starring Jean Parker, directed by William Berke

Produced by Golden Gate Pictures, distributed by Screen Guild Productions

'Neath Canadian Skies (1946) – produced by William David, directed by B. Reeves Eason from a story by James Oliver Curwood
North of the Border (1946) – produced by William David, directed by B. Reeves Eason from a story by James Oliver Curwood
Flight to Nowhere (1946) – with Alan Curtis & Evelyn Ankers, produced by William David, directed by William Rowland
My Dog Shep (1946) – starring Flame, produced by William David, directed by Ford Beebe
Death Valley (1946) – produced by William David, directed by Lew Landers
Scared to Death (1947) – starring Bela Lugosi, produced by William David, directed by Christy Cabanne

Produced by Edward F. Finney Productions, distributed by Screen Guild Productions
Queen of the Amazons (1947) – written by Roger Merton, directed by Edward Finney
The Prairie (1947) – Based on a story by James Fenimore Cooper, written by Arthur St. Claire (screenplay) directed by Frank Wisbar

Produced by Somerset Pictures, distributed by Screen Guild Productions
Road to the Big House (1947) – written by Aubrey Wisberg, directed by Walter Colmes
The Burning Cross (1947) – written by Aubrey Wisberg, directed by Walter Colmes

Produced by Jack Schwarz Productions, distributed by Screen Guild Productions
Buffalo Bill Rides Again (April 19, 1947) – produced by Jack Schwarz, directed by Bernard B. Ray
Hollywood Barn Dance (June 21, 1947) – produced by Jack Schwarz, directed by Bernard B. Ray

Distributed only by Screen Guild Productions

Trail of the Mounties (1947) – Bali Pictures – starring Russell Hayden & Jennifer Holt, directed by Howard Bretherton
Bush Pilot (1947) – Dominion Pictures, a Canadian company – starring Jack La Rue
Boy! What a Girl! (1947) – Herald Pictures – race film musical featuring black performers
Bells of San Fernando (1947) – Hillcrest Productions
Dragnet (1947) aka Dark Bullet and A Shot in the Dark – Fortune Films
Killer Dill (1947) –  Max M. King Productions, Nivel Pictures Corporation 
Harpoon (1948) – produced by Danches Bros. Productions
S.O.S. Submarine (1941) – 1941 Italian film released in US in 1948, aka Men on the Sea Floor
Miracle in Harlem (1948) – featuring black performers
The Mozart Story (1948) – Austrian film from Patrician Pictures
Tromba (1949) aka Tromba the Tiger Man (in 1952)
Omoo-Omoo the Shark God (June 10, 1949) – Esla Pictures – directed by Leon Leonard
Call of the Forest (1949) – Adventure Pictures, directed by John F Link

Reissues

'Hopalong Cassidy Westerns'
Hopalong Rides Again (1937) (in 1946)
Rustlers' Valley (1937) (in 1946)
North of the Rio Grande (1937) (in 1946)
Hills of Old Wyoming (1937) (in 1946)
Borderland (1937) (in 1946)
Trail Dust (1936) (in 1946)
Hopalong Cassidy Returns (1936) (in 1946)
Hop-Along Cassidy (1935) (in 1946)*Secret of the Wastelands (1941) (in 1946)
Outlaws of the Desert (1941) (in 1946)
Twilight on the Trail (1941) (in 1946)
Riders of the Timberline (1941) (in 1946)
Stick to Your Guns (1941) (in 1946)
Wide Open Town (1941) (in 1946)
Pirates on Horseback (1941) (in 1946)
Border Vigilantes (1941) (in 1946)
In Old Colorado (1941) (in 1946)
Three Men from Texas (1940) (in 1946)
Bar 20 Justice (1938) (in 1947)
Heart of Arizona (1938) (in 1947)
Cassidy of Bar 20 (1938) (in 1947)
Partners of the Plains (1938) (in 1947)
Texas Trail (1937) (in 1947)
The Frontiersmen (1938) (in 1947)
Stagecoach War (1940) (in 1948)
Hidden Gold (1940) (in 1948)
Santa Fe Marshal (1940) (in 1948)
Law of the Pampas (1939) (in 1948)
Range War (1939) (in 1948)
Renegade Trail (1939) (in 1948)
Sunset Trail (1938) (in 1948)
In Old Mexico (1938) (in 1948)
Pride of the West (1938) (in 1948)

King of the Turf (1939) (in 1948)
Flirting with Fate (1938) (in 1948)
The Duke of West Point (1938) (in 1948)*Flirting with Fate (1938) (in 1948)
Forbidden Music (1936) (in 1948)
Red Salute (1935) (in 1946)
March of the Wooden Soldiers (1934) (in 1950)
Midnight (1934) (in 1948)
That's My Boy (1932) (in 1948)
Miss Annie Rooney (1942) (in 1948)
Captain Kidd (1945) (in 1952)
The Macomber Affair (1947) (in 1952)
The Iron Mask (1929) (in 1953)
Mr Robinson Crusoe (1932) (in 1953)
Chu Chin Chow (1934) (in 1953)

Featurettes
The Case of the Baby Sitter (1947) – produced by Carl Hittleman for Screen Art Pictures Corp. 
 The Hat Box Mystery (1947) – produced by Hittleman
Bandit Island (1953) – in 3-D

Produced by Ron Ormond for Western Adventure Productions, distributed by Screen Guild Productions

Dead Man's Gold (1948)
Mark of the Lash (1948)
Frontier Revenge (1948)
Son of a Bad Man (1949)
Son of Billy the Kid (1949)
Outlaw Country (1949)

Distributed by Screen Guild and produced by Lippert Productions

Shoot to Kill (1947) – produced and directed by William Berke
Jungle Goddess (1948) – written by Jo Pagano, produced by William Stephens, directed by Lewis D. Collins
40,000 Eyes (1948)
Thunder in the Pines (1948) – produced by William Stephens, directed by Robert Edwards
Shep Comes Home (1948) – produced by Ron Ormond, written and directed by Ford Beebe
Highway 13 (1948) produced by William Stephens, directed by William Berke
Black Stallion (1948) aka The Return of Wildfire – produced by Carl Hittleman, directed by Ray Taylor
Last of the Wild Horses (1948) – directed by Robert Lippert (the only film he directed)
Arson, Inc. (1949) – directed by William Berke
Deputy Marshal (1949) – directed by William Berke
Red Desert (1949) aka Texas Manhunt – directed by Ford Beebe
Treasure of Monte Cristo (1949) – directed by William Berke
Sky Liner (1949) – produced by William Stephens, directed by William Berke
I Shot Jesse James (1949) – produced by Carl Hittleman, written and directed by Sam Fuller
Grand Canyon (1949) – produced by Carl Hittleman, directed by Rob Landres
Rimfire (1949) – produced by Ron Ormond, directed by B. Reeves Eason
Texas Manhunt (1949) aka Red Desert – starring Don Barry, directed by Ford Beebe
Apache Chief (1949) – directed by Frank McDonald
Ringside (1949) – directed by Frank McDonald
Curfew Breakers (1957) – directed by Alex Wells

Produced by Lippert Productions, distributed by Lippert Productions

Hollywood Varieties (January 15, 1950)
Radar Secret Service (January 28, 1950)
Hostile Country (March 24, 1950)
Everybody's Dancin' (March 31, 1950) – Nunes-Cooley Productions
Marshal of Heldorado (April 21, 1950) – starring James Ellison, produced by Ron Ormond, directed by Thomas Carr
Operation Haylift (May 5, 1950) – directed by William Berke, Produced by Joe Sawyer, written by Dean Riesner & Joe Sawyer
Colorado Ranger (May 12, 1950) – starring James Ellison, produced by Ron Ormond, directed by Thomas Carr
Motor Patrol (May 12, 1950) – directed by Sam Newfield
Rocketship X-M (May 26, 1950)
West of the Brazos (June 2, 1950) – starring James Ellison, produced by Ron Ormond, directed by Thomas Carr
Crooked River (June 9, 1950)
Fast on the Draw (June 30, 1950)
The Return of Jesse James (September 8, 1950)
Border Rangers (October 6, 1950)
Holiday Rhythm (October 13, 1950)
Bandit Queen (December 22, 1950) – produced and directed by William Berke
Kentucky Jubilee (May 18, 1951)
Unknown World (October 26, 1951)
Superman and the Mole-Men (November 23, 1951)
Stronghold (February 15, 1952) – Tom Productions
The Jungle (August 1, 1952) aka Kaadu  
The Tall Texan (February 13, 1953)
Bandit Island (March 1953) (short)
A Day in the Country (March 13, 1953) (short)
The Great Jesse James Raid (July 17, 1953)
Fangs of the Wild (April 2, 1954)
The Cowboy (May 28, 1954) (Documentary) 
Thunder Pass (September 20, 1954)

Other

The Fighting Seventh (June 1951) aka Little Big Horn  – produced by Bali Productions – written and directed by Charles Marquis Warren (first film as director), produced by Carl Hittleman
G.I. Jane (1952) – produced by Murray Lerner for Murray Productions
F.B.I. Girl (1951) – produced by Jegar Productions
Navajo (1952) (documentary) – Hall Bartlett Productions
Outlaw Women (1952) – Ron Ormond Productions
Loan Shark (1952) – Encore Productions
Hellgate (1952) – Commander Films
Mr. Walkie Talkie (1952) – Rockingham Productions
White Goddess (1953) – Arrow Productions – episodes of Ramar of the Jungle
Eyes of the Jungle (1953) aka Destination Danger – episodes of Ramar of the Jungle
Project Moon Base (1953) – Galaxy Pictures Inc.
Hollywood Thrill-Makers (1954) – Kosloff
Monster from the Ocean Floor (1954) – Palo Alto Productions (Roger Corman)
Thunder Over Sangoland (1955) – episodes of Ramar of the Jungle
Phantom of the Jungle (1955) – episodes of Ramar of the Jungle
King Dinosaur (1955) – Zimgor
Air Strike (1955) – produced, directed, and written by Cy Roth

Produced by Earle Lyon and Richard Bartlett's L&B Productions, released by Lippert Pictures
Silent Raiders (1954) – Co-Written, directed by and starring Richard Bartlett and Earle Lyon
The Silver Star (1955) – Co-Written, directed by and co-starring Richard Bartlett and Earle Lyon
The Lonesome Trail (1955) – Co-Written and directed by Richard Bartlett  and Earle Lyon

Produced by Don Barry Productions, released by Lippert Pictures

The Dalton Gang (October 21, 1949)
Square Dance Jubilee (November 11, 1949)
Tough Assignment (November 15, 1949)
I Shot Billy the Kid (July 27, 1950)
Frank James Rides Again (August 12, 1950) aka Gunfire
Train to Tombstone (September 16, 1950)

Produced by Sigmund Neufeld Productions

Western Pacific Agent (1950) 
Hi-Jacked (1950)
Three Desperate Men (1951) 
Fingerprints Don't Lie (1951)
Mask of the Dragon (1951)
Stop That Cab (1951) (featurette)
Danger Zone (1951)
Roaring City (1951)
Pier 23 (1951)
Savage Drums (1951)
Yes Sir, Mr. Bones (1951)
Varieties on Parade (1951)
Lost Continent (1951) 
Leave It to the Marines (1951) 
Sky High (1951)
Sins of Jezebel (1953)

Produced by Deputy Corporation
The Baron of Arizona (Mar 1950) – written by Sam Fuller and Homer Croy, produced by Carl Hittleman, and directed by Sam Fuller
The Steel Helmet (Feb 1951) – written, produced and directed by Sam Fuller

Produced by R and L Productions (Hal Roach, Jr. and Lippert)
Tales of Robin Hood (1951)
As You Were (1952)

International pick-ups

Johnny the Giant Killer (1950, released 1953) – France
Highly Dangerous aka Time Running Out (1950)
The Fighting Men (1950) – Italy
The Siege (1950) – Spain
Valley of Eagles (1951) – produced by Independent Sovereign Films
The Adventurers (1951) – produced by Mayflower
Pirate Submarine (1952) – France
Ghost Ship (1952) – Vernon Sewell Productions
The Queen of Sheba (1952) – Oro Films – Italy
Secret People (1952) – Ealing Productions
I'll Get You (1952) aka Escape Route – Banner Films
Bachelor in Paris (1952) – Roger Proudlock Productions
Women of Twilight (1952) aka Twilight Women – Angel Productions
Norman Conquest (1953) aka Park Plaza 605 – B & A Productions
Undercover Agent (1953) aka Counterspy – Abtcon Pictures
The Shadow Man (1953) aka Street of Shadow – William Nassour Productions
The Man from Cairo (1953) – Michaeldavid Productions
Cosh Boy (1953) aka The Slasher – Romulus Productions
The Limping Man (1953) – Banner Films Ltd.
White Fire (1953) aka Three Steps to the Gallows – Tempean Films
River Beat (1954) – Insignia Films
They Were So Young (1954) – Coronoa
Dangerous Voyage (1954) – Merton Park Studios
The Black Pirates (1954) – El Salvador
Simba (1955) – Group Film
The Curious Adventures of Mr. Wonderbird (1952, released 1957) – Clarge Distributors (France)

H-N Productions, distributed by Lippert Pictures
For Men Only (Jan 1952) – produced and directed by Paul Henreid

Co-productions with Hammer Films

There is No Escape (1949) aka The Dark Road
The Last Page (1952) aka Man Bait
Wings of Danger (1952) aka Dead on Course
Stolen Face (1952)
Lady in the Fog (1952) aka Scotland Yard Inspector
Gambler and the Lady (1952)
Bad Blonde (1953)
36 Hours (1953) aka Terror Street
Face the Music (1953) aka The Black Glove
Spaceways (1953)
Blackout (1954) aka Murder by Proxy
The House Across the Lake (1954) aka Heat Wave
A Stranger Came Home (1954) aka The Unholy Four
Mask of Dust (1954) aka Race for Life
Third Party Risk (1954) aka The Big Deadly Game
Five Days (1954) aka Paid to Kill
Life with the Lyons (1954) aka Family Affair
The Glass Cage (1955) aka The Glass Tomb
The Quatermass Xperiment (1955)

Produced by Associated Film Releasing Corp., Intercontinental Pictures, Inc., distributed by Fox
Massacre (June 1956) – written by D.D. Beauchamp, produced by Robert L. Lippert Jr, directed by Louis King

Produced by Lippert's Regal Films, distributed by 20th Century Fox

The Desperadoes Are in Town (Nov 1956) – directed by Kurt Neumann
Stagecoach to Fury (Dec 1956) – produced by Earl Lyon, directed by William Claxton – nominated for an Oscar
The Women of Pitcairn Island (Dec 1956) – written by Aubrey Wisberg, directed by Jean Yarbrough
The Black Whip (Dec 1956) – written by Orville Hampton, produced bu Robert Kraushaar, directed by Charles Marquis Warren
The Quiet Gun (Jan 1957) aka Fury at Rock River – written and produced by Earle Lyon, directed by William F Claxton
The Storm Rider (Mar 1957) – written and directed by Edward Bernds, produced by Bernard Glasser
She Devil (April 1957) – written, produced and directed by Kurt Neumann
Kronos (April 1957) – produced and directed by Kurt Neumann
Badlands of Montana (May 1957) – written, produced and directed by Daniel B. Ullman
Lure of the Swamp (May 1957) – directed by Hubert Cornfield
The Abductors (Jul 1957) – written and produced by Ray Wander, directed by Andrew McLaglen
Apache Warrior (July 1957) – directed by Elmo Williams, produced by Plato A. Skouras, written by Carroll Young, Kurt Neumann & Eric Norden
God Is My Partner (1957) – starring Walter Brennan, directed by William F. Claxton, produced by Sam Hersh
Hell on Devil's Island (Aug 1957) – written by Steven Ritch, produced by Leon Chooluck and Laurence Stewart, directed by Christian Nyby
Under Fire (Sept 1957) – written by James Landis, produced by Plato A. Skouras, directed by James B. Clark
Rockabilly Baby (Oct 1957) – produced and directed by William Claxton
Ghost Diver (Oct 1957) – written and directed by Richard Einfeld and Merrill G. White
Young and Dangerous (Oct 1957) – produced and directed by William Claxton
Plunder Road (Dec 1957) – directed by Hubert Cornfield
Escape from Red Rock (Dec 1957) – written and directed by Edward Bernds, produced by Bernard Glasser
Diamond Safari (Feb 1958) – co produced with Scheslinger Org in South Africa – producer and directed by Gerald Mayer
Ambush at Cimarron Pass (Feb 1958) – early role for Clint Eastwood, directed by Jodie Copelan, produced by Herbert E. Mendelson, written by John K. Butler and Richard G. Taylor
Showdown at Boot Hill (May 1958) – starring Charles Bronson, directed by Gene Fowler Jr., produced by Harold E. Knox, written by Louis Vittes
Thundering Jets (May 1958) – directed by Helmut Dantine, produced by Jack Leewood, written by James Landis
Wolf Dog (July 1958) – produced and directed by Sam Newfield, written by Louis Stevens
Sierra Baron (July 1958) – written by Houston Brance, produced by Plato Skouras, directed by James B Clark
Space Master X-7 (Jul 1958) – Directed by Edward Bernds, produced by Bernard Glasser, written by George Worthing Yates and Daniel Mainwaring
Gang War (July 1958) – starring Charles Bronson, written by Louis Vittes, directed by Gene Fowler Jr
Villa!! (Oct 1958) – written by Louis Vittes, produced by Plato Skouras, directed by James B Clark
Frontier Gun (Dec 1958) – Directed by Paul Landres, Produced by Richard E. Lyons, written by Stephen Kandel
Lone Texan (March 1959) – starring Willard Parker written by James Landis, produced by Jack Leewood, directed by Paul Landres

Co-productions between Regal Films & Emirau Productions, distributed by Fox

The Unknown Terror (1957)
Copper Sky (1957)
Ride a Violent Mile (Nov 1957) – story & directed by Charles Marquis Warren
Back from the Dead (1957)
Desert Hell (1958)
Cattle Empire (1958)
Blood Arrow (1958)

Distributed by 20th Century-Fox, produced as Regal but released as 20th Century-Fox
The Fly (Aug 1958) – written by James Clavell, produced and directed by Kurt Neumann

Produced by Lippert's Associated Producers, distributed by 20th Century Fox

Alaska Passage (Feb 1959) – written and directed by Edward Bernds produced by Bernard Glasser
The Little Savage (March 1959) –  director Byron Haskin, producer Jack Leewood, writer Eric Norden
The Sad Horse (March 1959) –  director James B. Clark, producer Richard E. Lyons, writer Charles Hoffman
The Miracle of the Hills (July 1959) – written by Charles Hoffman, directed by Paul Landres
Return of the Fly (July 1959) – written and directed by Edward Bernds, produced by Bernard Glasser
The Alligator People (July 1959) – directed by Roy Del Ruth, produced by Jack Leewood, written by Orville H. Hampton
Five Gates to Hell (Sept 1959) – written, produced and directed by James Clavell
The Oregon Trail (Sept 1959) – written by Louis Vittes, produced by Richard Einfelfd, directed by Gene Fowler Jr
Blood and Steel (Dec 1959) – produced by Gene Corman, directed by Bernard L. Kowalski
Here Come the Jets (Jun 1959) – director Gene Fowler, Jr., producer Richard Einfeld, writer Louis Vittes 
The Rookie (Dec 1959) – starring Tom Noonan – directed by George O'Hanlon
The 3rd Voice (Jan 1960) – written & directed by Hugh Cornfeld, produced by Maury Dexter
Valley of the Redwoods (May 1960) –  director William Witney, producer Gene Corman, written by Leo Gordon & Daniel Madison 
Young Jesse James (Aug 1960) – starring Ray Strickland & Willard Parker, written by Orvill Hampton, produced by Jack Leewood, directed by William F Claxton
Walk Tall (Sept 1960) – written by Joseph Fritz.produced & directed by Maury Dexter
Desire in the Dust (Oct 1960) – starring Raymond Burr, produced and directed by William F Claxton
Freckles (Dec 1960) – Directed by	Andrew McLaglen, written and produced by Harry Spalding
The Secret of the Purple Reef (Dec 1960) – produced by Gene Corman, directed by William Witney
Tess of the Storm Country (Dec 1960) – Directed by Paul Guilfoyle, produced by Everett Chambers, written by Charles Lang & Rupert Hughes
Twelve Hours to Kill (April 1960) –  directed by Edward L. Cahn, produced by John Healy
13 Fighting Men (April 1960) – directed by Harry W. Gerstad, Produced by Jack Leewood, Screenplay by Robert Hamner & Jack W. Thomas
The Long Rope (Feb 1961) – written by Robert Hamner, produced by Margia Dean directed by William Witney
Sniper's Ridge (Feb 1961) – produced and directed by John A. Bushelman, written by Tom Maruzzi
The Canadians (Mar 1961) – written and directed by Burt Kennedy (his directorial debut)
The Little Shepherd of Kingdom Come (April 1961) – produced by Maury Dexter, directed by Andrew McLaglen
The Silent Call (May 1961) – directed by John A. Bushelman, produced by Leonard A. Schwartz, written by Tom Maruzzi – last appearance of Gail Russell
Misty (June 1961) – starring David Ladd, directed by James Clark, written by Ted Sherdeman
20,000 Eyes (Jun 1961) – written by Jack Thomas, produced & directed by Jack Leewood 
Battle at Bloody Beach (Jun 1961) – starring Audie Murphy, written and produced by Richard Maibaum, directed by Herbert Coleman
The Big Show (Jul 1961) – starring Esther Williams and Cliff Robertson – written by Ted Sherdeman, directed by James B. Clark, produced by Clark and Sherdeman
7 Women from Hell (Oct 1961) – Directed by Robert D. Webb, Produced by Harry Spalding, Written by Jesse Lasky Jr
The Two Little Bears (Nov 1961) – written and produced by George W George, directed by Randall Hood 
The Purple Hills (Nov 1961) – produced and directed by Maury Dexter
Hand of Death (Mar 1962) – produced and written by Eugene Ling, directed by Gene Nelson
The Broken Land (April 1962) – starring Jack Nicholson, directed by John A. Bushelman, produced by Leonard A. Schwartz, written by Edward J. Lakso 
The Cabinet of Caligari (May 1962) – written by Robert Bloch, produced and directed by Robert Kay
Womanhunt (June 1962) – written by Harry Spalding, produced and directed by Maury Dexter
Air Patrol (Jul 1962) – written by Harry Spalding, produced and directed by Maury Dexter
The Firebrand (Aug 1962) – written by Harry Spalding, produced and directed by Maury Dexter
Young Guns of Texas (Nov 1962) – written by Harry Spalding, produced and directed by Maury Dexter
The Day Mars Invaded Earth (Feb 1963) – written by Harry Spalding, produced and directed by Maury Dexter
House of the Damned (Mar 1963) – written by Harry Spalding, produced and directed by Maury Dexter
Police Nurse (May 1963) – written by Harry Spalding, produced and directed by Maury Dexter
Harbor Lights (Jul 1963) – written by Harry Spalding, produced and directed by Maury Dexter
The Young Swingers (Sept 1963) – written by Harry Spalding, produced and directed by Maury Dexter
Thunder Island (Sept 1963) – written by Jack Nicholson and Don Devlin, produced & directed by Jack Leewood
Surf Party (Jan 1964) – written by Harry Spalding, produced and directed by Maury Dexter
Felicia (1964)- written & directed by  David E. Durston, produced by Steve Bono

Produced by Princess Production, released by Fox
Murder Inc (Jun 1960) – directed by Burt Balaban & Stuart Rosenberg, produced by Balaban

Produced by Associated Producers but released as a 20th Century-Fox production, released by Fox
A Dog in Flanders (Mar 1959) –  director James B. Clark, producer Robert B. Radnitz, writer Ted Sherdeman
It Happened in Athens (June 1962) – starring Jayne Mansfield directed by Andrew Marton

Produced by Associated Producers, released in US by American International Pictures
The Last Man on Earth (Mar 1964) – starring Vincent Price, directed by Ubaldo Ragona and Sidney Salkow

Produced by Capri Production, distributed by 20th Century-Fox
The High Powered Rifle (Sept 1960) – written by Joseph Fritz, produced and directed by Maury Dexter

Produced by Lippert Films, distributed by 20th Century-Fox (in England)

Witchcraft (Mar 1964) – starring Lon Chaney Jr, written by Harry Spalding, produced by Jack Parsons, directed by Don Sharp
The Horror of It All (Aug 1964) – written by Ray Russell, directed by Terence Fisher
Night Train to Paris (Sept 1964) – written by Harry Spalding, produced by Jack Parsons, directed by Robert Douglas
The Earth Dies Screaming (Oct 1964) – written  by Harry Spalding, produced by Jack Parsons, directed by Terence Fisher
Raiders from Beneath the Sea (Dec 1964) – written by Harry Spalding, produced and directed by Maury Dexter
Curse of the Fly (May 1965) – written by Harry Spalding, produced by Jack Parsons, directed by Don Sharp
Wild on the Beach (Aug 1965) – written by Harry Spalding, produced & directed by Maury Dexter
Spaceflight IC-1: An Adventure in Space (Oct 1965) – written by Harry Spalding, produced by Jack Parsons, directed by Bernard Knowles
The Return of Mr. Moto (Oct 1965) – produced by Jack Parsons, directed by Edward Morris
The Murder Game (Dec 1965)  – written by Harry Spalding, Iving Yergin, produced by Jack Parsons, directed by Sidney Salkow
The Last Shot You Hear (May 1969) – produced by Jack Parsons, directed by Gordon Hessler

Produced by Lippert Films, distributed by Feature Film Corp, made in Philippines
Walls of Hell (1964) – Hemisphere Pictures – directed by Eddie Romero
Moro Witch Doctor (1964) – Hemisphere Pictures, Associated Producers – produced & directed by Eddie Romero
Back Door to Hell (1964) – produced by Fred Roos, directed by Monte Hellman
Flight to Fury (1964) – written by Jack Nicholson, produced by Fred Roos, directed by Monte Hellman
Cordillera (1965) – adaptation of Flight to Fury, directed by Eddie Romero

Produced by Lippert Films, distributed by 20th Century-Fox (made in US)
That Tennessee Beat (1966) – produced and directed by Richard Brill

Produced by Jack Parsons-Neil McCallum Productions, filmed in England, released by Paramount
Walk a Tightrope (1964) – produced by Jack Parsons, directed by Frank Nesbitt

Produced by Jack Parsons-Neil McCallum Productions, filmed in England, released by Fox
The Eyes of Annie Jones (May 1964) – written by Louis Vittes, produced by Jack Parsons, directed by Reginald Le Borg

Produced by Parroch-McCallum with API, distributed by Paramount, filmed in England
Troubled Waters (1964) – Parroch-McCallum – starring Tab Hunter, produced by Lippert and Jack Parsons – released by Fox
The Woman Who Wouldn't Die (1965) aka Catacombs – written by Daniel Mainwaring, produced by Jack Parsons, directed by Gordon Hessler – released by Warners

Other Lippert movies distributed by 20th Century-Fox
The Yellow Canary (1963) – Cooga Mooga Productions – starring Pat Boone, written by Rod Serling, produced by Maury Dexter, directed by Buzz Kulik

See also
 Alameda Theatre (Alameda, California)
 Tiffany Theater

References

External links
 Robert Lippert at Find a Grave
 
 Robert Lippert Foundation

1909 births
1976 deaths
People from Alameda, California
Film producers from California
20th Century Studios people
Film distributors (people)
Defunct American film studios
20th-century American businesspeople
Film exhibitors
Burials at Woodlawn Memorial Park Cemetery (Colma, California)